The species name sanctus (Latin for "sacred") occurs in several binomial names in the taxonomy of life. Examples include:

 Confuciusornis sanctus, a prehistoric primitive bird
Rubus ulmifolius subsp. sanctus, or holy bramble
 Todiramphus sanctus, the sacred kingfisher
 Tarachodes sanctus, a species of praying mantis

Broad-concept articles
Taxonomy (biology)
Taxonomic lists